Neoascia clausseni is a species of hoverfly in the family Syrphidae.

Distribution
Algeria, Morocco, Tunisia.

References

Eristalinae
Insects described in 1998
Diptera of Africa